Arsenal is a ghost station on the Paris métro, situated on line 5 between the stations of Bastille and Quai de la Rapée, in the 4th arrondissement of Paris.

The station

Arsenal station opened to the public in 1906. It was closed on 2 September 1939, as a result of the mobilization of employees of the Compagnie du chemin de fer métropolitain de Paris (CMP) in World War II. It was never reopened and today serves as a training centre for RATP agents. Access to the station is situated on Boulevard Bourdon.

Culture
Because of the station's location (just before Quai de la Rapée in the direction towards Voie des Finances), the station played a key element in the film La Grosse Caisse, starring Bourvil in 1965.

It has been proposed to convert Arsenal into a swimming pool, theatre, restaurant or sculpture gallery.

References

Paris Métro line 5
Paris Métro stations in the 4th arrondissement of Paris
Ghost stations of the Paris Métro
Railway stations closed in 1939
Railway stations in France opened in 1906